Høyland is a former municipality in Rogaland county, Norway. The  municipality was located at the innermost end of the Gandsfjorden in the western part of the present-day municipality of Sandnes. The municipality existed from 1838 until its dissolution in 1965. The main church for the municipality was Høyland Church.

History
The parish of Høiland was established as a municipality on 1 January 1838 (see formannskapsdistrikt law). According to the 1835 census the municipality had a population of 2,286.  On 6 April 1861, the large village of Sandnes (population: 440) was declared to be a ladested (seaport town).  It was therefore separated from Høyland to constitute a municipality of its own. The split left Høyland with 3,376 inhabitants. In 1912, a part of Høyland with 41 inhabitants was moved to the neighboring municipality of Hetland to the north.  In 1957, a part of Høyland with 18 inhabitants was moved to the town of Sandnes.

On 1 January 1965, there were many municipal changes across Norway due to the recommendations of the Schei Committee.  On that date the municipality of Høyland was merged with the town of Sandnes and most of the municipalities of Hetland and Høle to form a new, larger municipality of Sandnes. Prior to the merger, Høyland had a population of 20,353.

Government
All municipalities in Norway, including Høyland, are responsible for primary education (through 10th grade), outpatient health services, senior citizen services, unemployment and other social services, zoning, economic development, and municipal roads.  The municipality is governed by a municipal council of elected representatives, which in turn elects a mayor.

Municipal council
The municipal council  of Høyland was made up of 41 representatives that were elected to four year terms.  The party breakdown of the final municipal council was as follows:

See also

List of former municipalities of Norway

References

External links
 Map of Høyland (page 4) 

Sandnes
Former municipalities of Norway
1838 establishments in Norway
1965 disestablishments in Norway